Mary Bonham-Christie (23 July 1865 – 28 April 1961) called "the Demon of Brownsea", was the reclusive owner of Brownsea Island in Poole Harbour, Dorset from 1927 until her death in 1961.

Personal life
Mary Florence Whitburn was born in Wandsworth, South London, in Q3, 1865, the daughter of Charles Joseph Sofer Whitburn and Fanny Hales Whitburn, of Addington Park in Kent, who were married in Q4, 1863. She married Robert Bonham Bax Christie in Q1, 1889; they had a daughter, Elsie, a son Robert and a grandson John (son of Robert).

Owner of Brownsea Island
Mary Bonham-Christie purchased Brownsea Island at auction in 1927, for £125,000. She ordered the island's 200 residents to leave, and banned hunting and fishing on grounds of animal cruelty. The protracted legal battle that followed may have turned violent with the fire that consumed much of the island in 1934 (the cause of the fire was never determined, though Bonham-Christie blamed the Boy Scouts and forbade them to camp on the island afterwards). Fearing further threats, she hired a bodyguard to eject intruders to the island. While unpopular, her minimal interference with the island's natural contents meant that it became a flourishing habitat for red squirrels, Sandwich tern, avocet, and other wildlife. "The old lady knew she wasn't popular but I don't think she cared," said a former boatman who served the island during her tenure there.

Death and legacy

Mary Bonham-Christie died on 28 April 1961, aged 96 years, in a local nursing home off the island where her family had moved her. Her grandson and heir John Bonham-Christie had plans to develop the island. A group of environmental conservationists, led by Helen Brotherton, organized to oppose his plans. They succeeded in raising sufficient funds to persuade the Treasury to take Brownsea Island as settlement of death duties, which was accepted provided that the National Trust took over the island. However, this was also subject to payment to the Treasury of £100,000 - which the National Trust did not have. An arrangement was finally reached whereby three other parties contributed £25,000 each: The Dorset Wildlife Trust - provided they could run half the island; the John Lewis Partnership - for a 99-year lease of the castle & grounds (for staff holidays); and the Scout & Guide Movements - provided they could have access to the rest of the Island for their members.

There is a monument to Mary Bonham-Christie in the churchyard at Marston Bigot; her remains were cremated at Bournemouth, and although the local paper said her ashes were scattered at Brownsea Island, the memorial at Marston Bigot states that her ashes are at Bournemouth crematorium. In 2007, BBC Radio 4 broadcast a half-hour report about Mary Bonham-Christie, titled "For Nature, Not Humans."

References

1865 births
1961 deaths
People from Wandsworth
English landowners
20th-century women landowners
Burials in Dorset
People from Dorset